Sabine Rubin is a French politician representing la France Insoumise. She was elected to the French National Assembly on 18 June 2017, becoming the Member of Parliament for the 9th constituency of the department of Seine-Saint-Denis.

See also
 2017 French legislative election

References

Living people
Deputies of the 15th National Assembly of the French Fifth Republic
La France Insoumise politicians
Women members of the National Assembly (France)
21st-century French women politicians
1960 births